The Clausura 2014 Copa MX Final was the final of the Clausura 2014 Copa MX the fourth edition of the Copa MX under its current format and 71st overall organized by the Mexican Football Federation, the governing body of association football in Mexico.

The final is contested in a single leg format between a Liga MX club, UANL and an Ascenso MX club, Oaxaca, which is the first time a Liga MX and Ascenso MX team met in the final. The leg was hosted by UANL at Estadio Universitario in San Nicolás de los Garza, Nuevo León on April 9, 2014. The winner earned a spot to face the winner of the Apertura 2013 edition, Monarcas Morelia, in a playoff to qualify as Mexico 3 to the 2015 Copa Libertadores.

Venue
Due to the tournament's regulations the higher seed among both finalists during the group stage would host the final, thus Estadio Universitario hosted the final. The home venue of UANL since 1967, it has staged various Copa México and Liga MX finals, most recently the Apertura 2011 Liga MX final where UANL were victorious. Estadio Universitario has also hosted four matches of the 1986 FIFA World Cup, the stadium was the site where Mexico was eliminated in penalty kicks by West Germany. The stadium also staged eight matches of the 2011 FIFA U-17 World Cup, which included most of Group B matches and some knockout stage matches.

Background
Tigres UANL, who is a two time winner last won the tournament in 1996 while Oaxaca has never won the tournament in their one year of existence. UANL last reached a final of any kind back in 2011 when they defeated Santos Laguna 4–1 on aggregate to win the Liga MX title. Oaxaca, who played their first season during the Apertura 2013 Ascenso MX season has previously never reached any type of final. Oaxaca reached the semifinals in the Apertura 2013 edition but were eliminated by Club Atlas in penalty kicks. This was the first final in the Copa MX era that a Liga MX and an Ascenso MX club faced in the final.

UANL won four and drew two group stage matches and scored 20 goals during group stage, as they were seeded second, they eliminated Atlante in the quarterfinals and Veracruz in the semifinals.

Oaxaca won four, drew one and lost one group stage matches, as they were seeded second they eliminated Querétaro in the quarterfinals and Pachuca in the semifinals, both teams are from Liga MX.

Road to the finals

Note: In all results below, the score of the finalist is given first.

Match

References

Copa MX Finals
2013–14 in Mexican football
Tigres UANL matches
Alebrijes de Oaxaca matches